The list of ship launches in 1923 includes a chronological list of ships launched in 1923.

References

Sources

1923
1923 in transport